Neustädter See is a lake in the Ludwigslust-Parchim district in Mecklenburg-Vorpommern, Germany. At an elevation of 33.4 m, its surface area is 1.29 km².

External links 
 

Lakes of Mecklenburg-Western Pomerania